Puy de Dôme (or  ) is a lava dome and one of the youngest volcanoes in the  region of Massif Central in central France. This chain of volcanoes including numerous cinder cones, lava domes and maars is far from the edge of any tectonic plate. Puy de Dôme was created by a Peléan eruption, some 10,700 years ago. The Puy-de-Dôme  is named after the volcano.

History

In pre-Christian Europe, Puy de Dôme served as an assembly place for spiritual ceremonies. Temples were built at the summit, including a Gallo-Roman temple of Mercury, the ruins of which were discovered in 1873.

In 1648, Florin Périer, at the urging of Blaise Pascal, supported Evangelista Torricelli's theory that barometric observations were caused by the weight of air by measuring the height of a column of mercury at three elevations on Puy de Dôme.

In 1875, a physics laboratory was built at the summit. Since 1956, a TDF antenna is also located there. On the top of the mountain, there is a transmitter for FM and TV.

Tourism

The Puy de Dôme is one of the most visited sites in the Auvergne region, attracting nearly 500,000 visitors a year. The summit offers expansive views of the Chaîne des Puys and Clermont-Ferrand. It is a well-known centre for paragliding.

The summit can be reached by two pedestrian paths: a southern one ("", formerly a Roman road) and a northern one ("")  which runs past the  crater. The GR 4 long-distance trail includes both paths to cross the mountain.

A road exists along the train tracks but it is closed to the general traffic, except for the military, service vehicles or emergencies.

At the top of the mountain, restaurants and shops are available as well as a visitor centre giving information on the history and geology of the area.

Geological heritage site
In respect of its key role in the development of volcanology as a geoscience discipline, the Puy-de-Dôme and Petite-Puy-de-Dôme volcanoes were included by the International Union of Geological Sciences (IUGS) in its assemblage of 100 'geological heritage sites' around the world in a listing published in October 2022.

Sport

Cycling 
In more recent times, Puy de Dôme has served as an occasional stage finish in the Tour de France. It was here that in 1964 Raymond Poulidor battled with Jacques Anquetil in one of the race's most famous moments, racing side by side up almost the entire climb; and that in 1975 Eddy Merckx was punched in the kidney by a spectator. According to Jean-François Pescheux, since the construction of a rack railway, and because of the very narrow road, the Tour would never return to the Puy de Dôme, its last ascent in the race being in 1988. During the 2020 Tour de France however, the first part of the ascent was covered via the Col de Ceyssat, during the 13th stage starting in Châtel-Guyon and in 2023 the Puy de Dôme will once again be a summit finish at the Tour, being the finale to stage 9.

The road is open to cyclists only during very limited periods (when other vehicles are prohibited).  In 2006 this was 7–9am on Wednesdays and Sundays between 1 May and 30 September. In 2017, it was the first checkpoint in the Transcontinental Race, a nonstop, unsupported bicycle race across Europe.

Motorsports 
The Circuit de Charade was a motorsport street circuit built in 1957 using pre-existing roads around the base of the Puy de Dôme. The venue hosted the French Grand Prix as well as the French motorcycle Grand Prix several times in the 1960s and early 1970s. In 1986, the track was shortened due to safety issues and was converted into a dedicated motorsport race track hosting track days, driving schools as well as historic motorsport events.

Climate 
While the lower areas of the mountain are firmly oceanic (Köppen Cfb), Puy de Dôme has a humid continental (Köppen: Dfb) with borderline subalpine characteristics, thanks to its high elevation. Its classification is determined from its January average being well below the -3°C threshold (with -5°C as its usual lows), and for having over 4 months of average temperatures that exceed 10°C (the requirement for this climate category is to have at least 3 months).

References 

 
 Global Volcanism Program: Chaîne des Puys

External links 
Puy de Dôme on Google Maps (Tour de France classic climbs)

Chaîne des Puys
Landforms of Puy-de-Dôme
Holocene lava domes
Dormant volcanoes
Tourist attractions in Puy-de-Dôme
Volcanoes of Metropolitan France
Mountains of Auvergne-Rhône-Alpes
Landforms of Auvergne-Rhône-Alpes
First 100 IUGS Geological Heritage Sites